John Strain may refer to:
 John Strain (bishop), Roman Catholic clergyman
 John Strain (mathematician), professor of mathematics
 John Paul Strain, American artist